Chalipuzha River (ചാലിപ്പുഴ) is a tributary of Iruvanjippuzha which joins with the Chaliyar River. The famous Thusharagiri waterfall is situated in this river. It appeared as a rocky river in summer seasons and filled with water in monsoon seasons.

 Rivers of Kozhikode district